The 1958–59 Yugoslav First League season was the 13th season of the First Federal League, the top level association football league of SFR Yugoslavia, since its establishment in 1946. Twelve teams contested the competition, with Red Star winning their fifth title.

Teams
Due to the reduction of the league from 14 to 12 clubs, at the end of the previous season four clubs were relegated (RNK Split, Spartak Subotica, OFK Belgrade and NK Zagreb) and were replaced by two teams - NK Rijeka and FK Sarajevo.

League table

Results

Top scorers

See also
1958–59 Yugoslav Second League
1958–59 Yugoslav Cup

External links
Yugoslavia Domestic Football Full Tables

Yugoslav First League seasons
Yugo
1